Danger is an unreleased Indian Bollywood horror thriller film, written and directed by Faisal Saif under his own banner Faith Pictures Inc.

Plot
The film is inspired by true events of Gaya (Bihar) Hotel's brutal owner who killed people and used their meat to serve others. Khan plays a Gujrati stockbroker in the film who gets trapped in this hotel along with his wife played by Vedita Pratap Singh.

Cast
Faisal Khan
Vedita Pratap Singh
Kavita Radheshyam
 Sony Charishta
 Nishant Pandey
 Asif Basra
 Meera

Production

Development
The official announcement of the film was announced in the end of July 2016. The title of the film was said to be Danger.

Casting
Saif approached actor Aamir Khan's brother Faisal Khan to play the main lead role and Khan found the script very exciting and became a part of it. Khan also claimed that he worked very hard on nailing the Gujrati accent required for the film. Later, Vedita Pratap Singh and Saif's regular fixture Kavita Radheshyam were added to the cast. Television actor Nishant Pandey was approached along with Sony Charishta to play other lead characters in the film.

Filming
The principal photography of the film commenced sometime in September 2016 and wrapped up with Pakistani actress Meera's song in December 2016.

Promotion
On 23 December, the makers released the First Look poster of the film. News sites such as India.com praised the First Look poster by calling it "Aamir Khan's brother Faissal Khan's comeback film looks creepy AF!".

References

External links
 

Indian thriller films
Hindi-language horror films
Films set in Mumbai
Unreleased Hindi-language films
Films directed by Faisal Saif